Huang Hongtao (born December 3, 1970) is a Chinese former international footballer who played as a goalkeeper. Since his retirement he moved into coaching and is currently a goalkeeping coach with Guangzhou R&F.

Biography
Huang Hongtao began his football career with second-tier football club Guangzhou Apollo in the 1990 Chinese league season where he was part of the team that came runners-up and won promotion to the top tier. With Guangzhou in the top tier, Huang had established himself as a regular within the team and was soon called up to the Chinese national team where he made his debut on April 20, 1992 against Indonesia in a 1992 AFC Asian Cup qualification game, which China won 2-0. By 1997 despite being at the peak of his career Huang took time out from football to start his coaching career in the United States. Upon his return, Huang returned to football and joined Sichuan Quanxing in 1998 before he returned to Guangzhou for a brief period before he retired from playing.

After finishing playing Huang soon moved into assistant coaching at Guangzhou where he remained for several seasons until he was appointed as the goalkeeping coach of the Chinese U-17 team in 2009.

References

External links
Player profile at Sodasoccer.com

1970 births
Living people
Footballers from Guangzhou
Chinese footballers
China international footballers
Guangzhou F.C. players
Sichuan Guancheng players

Association football goalkeepers
Guangzhou City F.C. non-playing staff
Association football goalkeeping coaches